Jamie Parsley (born December 8, 1969) is an American poet and Episcopal priest. He is the author of twelve books of poems and an associate poet laureate for the state of North Dakota.

Biography

Born in Fargo, North Dakota and raised near Harwood, North Dakota, Parsley received a master of fine arts degree in creative writing from Vermont College at Norwich University. He studied at the School of Theology at Thornloe University in Sudbury, Ontario, St. Joseph’s College, Standish, Maine and received a Master's Degree from Nashotah House Episcopal Seminary, Nashotah, Wisconsin.
 
Parsley was ordained as an Episcopal priest in 2004, became the priest-in-charge of St. Stephen’s Episcopal Church Fargo in 2008. Parsley began teaching Theology, Ethics, Philosophy, Literature and Writing at the University of Mary's Fargo campus in 2003. Parsley published his first book of poems, Paper Doves, Falling and Other Poems in 1992. Parsley’s book, Cloud, is a book-length poem on the bombing of Hiroshima. Parsley's book of collected haiku, no stars, no moon: new and collected haiku, was published in 2004.

Parsley was appointed an Associate Poet Laureate of North Dakota by Poet Laureate Larry Woiwode in 2004.

Reception
Parsley’s tenth book, Fargo, 1957, was published in 2010, and chronicled the stories of the victims and survivors of the  tornado that struck Fargo, North Dakota on June 20, 1957 and killed two of his mother's cousins. A reviewer in the High Plains Reader writes that Parsley's shows a "willingness to present himself and his own obsession honestly—the process of discovering these people and what they have left behind."

Publications 
Paper Doves, Falling and Other Poems Sunstone Press, Santa Fe, New Mexico. 1992
The Loneliness of Blizzards. Mellen Press; Lewiston, New York. 1995. 
Cloud: a poem in 2 acts; Mellen Press, Lewiston, New York 1997 
The Wounded Table Pudding House, Johnstown, Ohio 1999 
earth into earth, water into water. Enso Press, Fargo, North Dakota 2000
no stars, no moon. Mellen Press, Lewiston, New York 2004 
Ikon, Enso Press, Fargo, North Dakota 2005.
Just Once, Loonfeather Press, Bemidji, Minnesota 2007 
This Grass. Enso Press, Fargo, North Dakota. 2009 
Fargo, 1957. Institute for Regional Studies, North Dakota State University, Fargo, North Dakota. 2010 
Crow. Enso Press, Fargo, North Dakota. 2012 
That Word. North Star Press, St. Cloud, Minnesota. 2014 
The Downstairs Tenant and Other Stories (Institute for Regional Studies, North Dakota State University, 2014)

References

External links
 Official Website

1969 births
American male poets
Poets Laureate of North Dakota
Vermont College of Fine Arts alumni
American Episcopalians
American Episcopal priests
American Episcopal clergy
Writers from Fargo, North Dakota
Living people
21st-century American poets
21st-century American male writers